The SS Desabla was built by Hawthorn Leslie & Co. Ltd at Newcastle upon Tyne in 1913 for Bank Line, Glasgow (Andrew Weir Shipping & Trading Co. Ltd). She was the first oil tanker to join the Bank Line fleet and was chartered and operated for approximately one year by General Petroleum Company along the Pacific coast of the United States, Chile and Canada. In 1914 she was re-chartered to the British Government to transport oil from Texas to the United Kingdom. In 1915 she was torpedoed and sunk by German submarine U-17 off the coast of Scotland.

Known timeline
Main source: shipping records available on Ancestry.com

Sinking
On 12 June 1915 she was carrying a cargo of linseed oil from Port Arthur, Texas bound for Hull under the command of Mr. Fred S. Cowley. She was chased and intercepted by German submarine U-17. While the crew escaped in lifeboats, she was shelled, torpedoed and finally had to be scuttled with charges placed in the hull to sink her.

Excerpt from the Admiralty Report into the sinking:
"This Admiralty Oiler Transport No.63 was steaming on course when the German Submarine U-17 was seen right astern, gaining rapidly on the Steamship. The Master endeavoured to keep the vessel astern making various violent changes of course, but the submarine was much faster and rapidly took up a position close to the ship. The Enemy commenced to shell the Desabla at 07:20 am and kept up a continual fire at her from a Deck Gun. Realising that escape was impossible, the master stopped his Engine and ordered all hands into the Boats, which were successfully lowered at 08:20 am, allowing all the Crew to escape safely. Shortly after the enemy fired a Torpedo into the Ship at 08:30 am, but as she did not sink immediately some members of the crew went aboard her, presumably to place explosive charges and to loot her. When last seen by the Master at 12:30 pm, his ship was sinking fast and the Submarine had submerged out of sight. The survivors were picked up by the Armed Trawlers at 3:30 pm and taken ashore."

The wreck
The official report stated the wreck was 10 miles from Tod Head, Scotland. Divers searched there for years. However, the wreck of the SS Desabla is actually 35 miles from Montrose, Scotland. After a number of attempts, she was located in 2010 by divers from Marine Quest based in Eyemouth, Berwickshire.

References

External links
 Bank Line Profile at shipnostalgia.com
 Details of the Wreck at wrecksite.eu

 Profile of Andrew Weir Shipping and Trading Co. Ltd. at red-duster.co.uk
 Profile of The Bank Line at theshipslist.com
 The Fatherland, Vol. 3 by George Sylvester Viereck
 Conversation thread at shipnostalgia.com
 Marine Quest

1913 ships
Ships built on the River Tyne
Tankers of the United Kingdom
Steamships of the United Kingdom
Merchant ships of the United Kingdom
World War I merchant ships of the United Kingdom
Ships sunk by German submarines in World War I
Shipwrecks of Scotland